Rita Pitka Blumenstein (1936 – August 6, 2021) was the first certified traditional doctor in Alaska. She worked for the Alaska Native Tribal Health Consortium. Blumenstein was a member of the International Council of 13 Indigenous Grandmothers—a group of spiritual elders, medicine women and wisdom keepers—since its founding in 2004. World renown Natural healer.

Early life
Born to her recently widowed mother who lived in the village of Tununak, Nelson Island, Alaska, Blumenstein was born while her mother was in a fishing boat. Blumenstein felt angry not having her father around when she was a girl, because he died a month before she was born.

Blumenstein was given a Yup'ik name which means 'Tail End Clearing of the Pathway to the Light'—Rita saw the poetry in the name as she regarded herself as being born during "the tail end of the old ways."

Career
Blumenstein's healing abilities were recognised by the wise elders (grandmothers) of her tribe from an early age. Blumenstein began healing at the age of 4.

At the age of nine, Blumenstein's great-grandmother gave her thirteen eagle feathers and thirteen stones to give to the International Council of 13 Indigenous Grandmothers. Years later, when the International Council of 13 Indigenous Grandmothers convened for the first time, Blumenstein passed out these precious objects to the rest of the members with tears in her eyes.

After Blumenstein started healing people from the age of 4, she "worked at many hospitals delivering babies as a doctor's aide in Bethel and Nome". Rita carried on learning from her elders to become the first certified traditional doctor in Alaska and worked for the Alaska Native Tribal Health Consortium.

Blumenstein has taught in over 150 countries on cultural issues, basket weaving, song, and dance, "earning money for Native American Colleges". Her teachings about the "Talking circle" have been published.

In 2004, Blumenstein was approached by The Center for Sacred Studies to serve on the International Council of 13 Indigenous Grandmothers. The Council has been active in protecting indigenous rights and medicines, and traditional teachings on wisdom. The Council would go on to have an audience with religious leaders such as Pope Benedict XVI and the Dalai Lama later on. She was interviewed on her work with the Council by the Women Rising Radio Project in 2011.

In 2009, Blumenstein was inducted into the Alaska Women's Hall of Fame.

Personal life
Blumenstein was married to her husband, a Jewish man, for 43 years. Five of Blumenstein's six children have also died. Blumenstein's own health has not always been good and in 1995, she found that she had cancer. Blumenstein saw that being diagnosed with cancer made her realise that she needed to heal herself at a 'deeper' level—concluding that the cancer was due to her being angry that her father had not been present in her early years. Blumenstein was training her granddaughter to follow in her footsteps in order to be a healer and to know their Yup'ik traditions.

Awards and honors
 In 2006, both Blumenstein's tribe, the Yup'ik and her mayor declared the 18 February to be Rita Pitka Blumenstein day.
 In 2009, Blumenstein was one of fifty women inducted into the inaugural class of the Alaska Women's Hall of Fame. https://www.alaskawomenshalloffame.org/alumnae/rita-blumenstein/

Notes

References 
Schaefer, C, (2006) Grandmothers Council the World: wise women elders offer their vision for our planet. Trumpeter Books

External links
Rita Pitka Blumenstein's Biography

 
 International Council of 13 of Indigenous Grandmothers Official Website
 Official website of the documentary For the Next 7 Generations
 The Center for Sacred Studies
 Alaska Native Tribal Health Consortium

1936 births
2021 deaths
Indigenous American traditional healers
Native American environmentalists
Alaska Native activists
American environmentalists
American women environmentalists
American humanitarians
Women humanitarians
Folk healers
People from Bethel Census Area, Alaska
Prophets
Religious figures of the indigenous peoples of North America
Sustainability advocates
Yupik people
20th-century Native American women
20th-century Native Americans
21st-century Native American women
21st-century Native Americans